Bradley William Daluiso (born December 31, 1967) is a former American football placekicker in the National Football League. He played twelve seasons, the majority of them with the New York Giants. In addition, he played for the Atlanta Falcons, the Buffalo Bills, the Denver Broncos and the Oakland Raiders. Daluiso appeared in Super Bowl XXVI for the Buffalo Bills and in Super Bowl XXXV for the New York Giants. He retired after the 2001 season.  Daluiso played college football at the University of California, Los Angeles and Grossmont College, El Cajon, California. Brad was on the Late Show with David Letterman in 1997 (Episode #5.62). He is a member of the Sigma Chi fraternity.

1967 births
Living people
Players of American football from San Diego
American football placekickers
Grossmont Griffins football players
UCLA Bruins football players
Atlanta Falcons players
Buffalo Bills players
Denver Broncos players
New York Giants players
Oakland Raiders players
Ed Block Courage Award recipients